Oliver Perry Hay (May 22, 1846 – November 2, 1930) was an American herpetologist, ichthyologist, and paleontologist.

Hay was born in Jefferson County, Indiana, to Robert and Margaret Hay. In 1870, Hay graduated with a bachelor of arts from Eureka College in Illinois. He taught at the college as a sciences professor from 1870–1873. He married Mary E. Howsmon of Eureka, Illinois, in 1870. He was a professor at Oskaloosa College in Iowa from 1874–1876. He was a student at Yale University from 1876–1877. Seventeen years after earning his bachelors, he earned his PhD from Indiana University in Bloomington, Indiana. From 1877–1879, he taught at Abingdon College just before it was incorporated into his alma mater, Eureka College. His longest professorship was at Butler University from 1879–1892. From 1894 to 1895, he worked at the Field Museum of Natural History as assistant curator of zoology, where despite his specialty in ichthyology, he worked in all nonornithological fields of zoology. In 1912, Hay was appointed as a research associate at the Carnegie Institution for Science, and was given office space at the United States National Museum. There, he did much work with the USNM's collections in vertebrate paleontology. He published extensively on fossil turtles and Pleistocene mammals. The catalogs that he constructed were a great aid in recording existing knowledge and became standard references. His papers from 1911 to 1930 are stored at the Smithsonian Institution.

Oliver and Mary had four children together. Their son, William Perry Hay, was also a zoologist.

Works
Below is a partial list of Hay's work.

References

1846 births
1930 deaths
American paleontologists
American herpetologists
American ichthyologists
Oskaloosa College faculty
People associated with the Field Museum of Natural History